Cristina "El Grio" Castagna (23 December 1977 – 18 July 2009) was an Italian mountaineer and the first Italian woman to climb Makalu.  She died in 2009 on Broad Peak, after reaching the summit.

Early life
Castagna was born near San Quirico di Valdagno, near Vicenza. Youngest of four children, during her childhood, she began discovering mountains with her father and her uncle. After a technical degree she became an nurse in the ER hospital in Vicenza, a job she kept for all her life.

During her childhood, Castagna was very active, so her father gave her the nickname "Grio" (Cricket). She liked the nickname so much she kept it in her adult life ("El Grio") often in conjunction with "acchiappasogni" (dreamcatcher). She was also an avid reader and writer. After she became the first Italian woman to climb Makalu, she began to appear on Italian national news and newspapers. Nevertheless, she kept working as a nurse, climbing in her spare time, and initially at her own expense.

After a brief interest in volleyball, in her twenties she began climbing and ski mountaineering with Club Alpino Italiano (CAI). Although she had several sponsors, and was a member of the Salewa AlpineXtrem team, she never became a fully professional climber by status. She also worked as a nurse with the Alpini, and was enrolled with the National Alpini Association and Club Alpino Italiano.

Climbing achievements
Castagna was the first Italian woman to climb Makalu and at the time of her death, remained the youngest Italian woman to climb an eight-thousander (Shishapangma) at 27 years. In 2003, during an expedition headed by Tarcisio Bellò along with Mario Vielmo], she met Giampaolo Casarotto, who would later be her climbing partner for many expeditions. The Mount Everest attempt ended at 

In 2004 she climbed again with Vielmo, this time to the summit of Shishapangma, along with Michele Fait. In 2005 she climbed Gasherbrum II, alongside Gerlinde Kaltenbrunner In 2006 she attempted to climb Lhotse, again with [and Silvio Mondinelli, Marco Confortola and Giampaolo Corona. In 2008 came the successful Makalu attempt, with Casarotto. At  she was struck by the cold but met Waldemar Nicleviczand Irivan Burda who helped her. On 11 May she became the first Italian woman to reach the summit of Makalu, but suffered seriously frostbitten feet that would leave her in hospital for weeks.

In her last trip, she planned to climb both Broad Peak and Gasherbrum I along with Casarotto, but died during the descent after reaching the summit of Broad Peak. The Italian press agency Ansa mentioned her death in the prominent events of 2009 for Italy.

Broad Peak incident
Castagna and Giampaolo Casarotto planned to climb Broad Peak and Gasherbrum I in their 2009 expedition. Before leaving home, in a note later found by relatives, Castagna asked to be left on the mountains in case of severe accident.

The same day Fabrizio Zangrilli, Benedikt Böhm and Sebastian Haag from the Dynafit Gore-Tex-Team were climbing the mountain and spent a few stops with the Italian duo. On 18 July at 3 pm local time, Castagna and Casarotto reached the summit, despite severe weather conditions that had slowed the two climbers for nearly ten hours. Giampaolo Casarotto eventually managed to reach and try to rescue her, to no avail. The family, following her last will, decided to not attempt a recovery, thus avoiding risking other mountaineers' and porters' lives.

Castagna was remembered during an Italian Senate meeting by Lega Nord senators Paolo Franco and Gianvittore Vaccari. A month after Castagna's death, following an Italian expedition in Hindu Kush, Tarcisio Bellò solo-climbed an unnamed peak and named it after her.

Notable climbs

 Aconcagua, Argentina, 2003
 Shishapangma, Tibet, 2004, at 27 the youngest Italian woman to successfully climb an Eight thousander
 Gasherbrum II, Pakistan-China, 2005
 Lhotse, Nepal, 2006 (did not reach summit)
 Dhaulagiri, Nepal, 2007
 Makalu, Nepal-Tibet, 2008, first Italian woman to climb Makalu
 Broad Peak, Pakistan-China, 2009 (died during descent)

Humanitarian work
In 1999 Castagna served as a nurse in Valona during Italian government humanitarian mission "Missione Arcobaleno" in Albania. An eye hospital service, specialized in early cataract treatment, has since been created in Alepe, Ivory Coast to remember Castagna.

Places and routes
Cristina Castagna peak,  Hindu Kush, first ascent by Tarcisio Bellò, August 10, 2009
Cristina Castagna eye service, Alepè, Ivory Coast, an eye hospital.
Cristina Castagna mountaineering Center, Gothulti, Pakistan, in progress.
Via Fragile Esistenza (route in memory of Castagna), Campanile di Scagina, Piccole Dolomiti, Veneto, Italy. By Mario Brighente, Simone Gianesin, Bottegal, Gino Dal Cero, 2009

Books
On 1, July 2010 CAI Valdagno and Recoaro Terme sections published a biography by Massimo Fontana, on Castagna's life and achievements.

See also
Nives Meroi
Edurne Pasaban
Gerlinde Kaltenbrunner
Iñaki Ochoa de Olza
Broad Peak

References

External links
Cristina Castagna official page
the ill-fated summit attempt 
Cristina's loss on Italian media and Reinhold Messner's view on the accident
Veneti in the world: Amor di montagna, quando l'alpinismo diventa poesia (from 
ANA website (National Alpini Association)
La nueva espana interviews Rosa Fernández, on Broad Peek at the moment of the accident
La Stampa, Alberto Papuzzi: the last love words
Basti, Beni und Cristina Castagna auf dem Vorgipfel des Broad Peak (in german)
Sportivissimo, Luigi Centorno on Cristina Castagna
Bepi Magrin on Cristina Castagna

1977 births
2009 deaths
Italian mountain climbers
Mountaineering deaths
Sport deaths in Pakistan
People from the Province of Vicenza